Kaikala  (Kaikala) is a village in Hooghly District in the Indian state of West Bengal.

Geography
It has an average elevation of 18 metres (59 ft).

Demographics 
 India census, Kaikala had a population of 28,178. Males constitute 56% of the population and females 44%. Kaikala has an average literacy rate of 72%, higher than the national average of 59.5%: male literacy is 78%, and female literacy is 66%. In Kaikala, 10% of the population is under 6 years of age.

Economics
This is a rich agricultural area with several cold storages.

Transport
The Howrah-Tarakeswar line was opened in 1885.

References

Villages in Hooghly district